Malekan (electoral district) is the 9th electoral district in the East Azerbaijan Province of Iran. The district has 106,118 residents and elects one member of parliament. Malekan and Bonab were a joint electoral district from 1st to 5th Iranian legislative election and in just the first election  returned two members of Islamic Consultative Assembly.

1980
MPs in 1980 from the electorate of Bonab and Malekan. (1st)
 Yousef Jaberi
 Ali-Akbar Asghari

1984
MP in 1984 from the electorate of Bonab and Malekan. (2nd)
 Heidar Jafari

1988
MP in 1988 from the electorate of Bonab and Malekan. (3rd)
 Rasoul Sediqi Bonabi

1992
MP in 1992 from the electorate of Bonab and Malekan. (4th)
 Rasoul Sediqi Bonabi

1996
MP in 1996 from the electorate of Bonab and Malekan. (5th)
 Salman Khodadadi

2000
MP in 2000 from the electorate of Malekan. (6th)
 Salman Khodadadi

2004
MP in 2004 from the electorate of Malekan. (7th)
 Salman Khodadadi

2008
MP in 2008 from the electorate of Malekan. (8th)
 Salman Khodadadi

2012
MP in 2012 from the electorate of Malekan. (9th)
 Shahruz Afghami

2016

References

Electoral districts of East Azerbaijan
Malekan County
Deputies of Malekan